The 2017 ISSF World Cup is the annual edition of the ISSF World Cup in the Olympic shooting events, governed by the International Shooting Sport Federation.

Men's results

Rifle events

Pistol events

Shotgun events

Women's results

Rifle events

Pistol events

Shotgun events

Mixed events

Overall medal table

References 

ISSF World Cup
ISSF World Cup